Karyug is a rural locality (a settlement) in Yenangskoye Rural Settlement, Kichmengsko-Gorodetsky District, Vologda Oblast, Russia. The population was 110 as of 2002.

Geography 
Karyug is located 101 km southeast of Kichmengsky Gorodok (the district's administrative centre) by road.

References 

Rural localities in Kichmengsko-Gorodetsky District